Platinaire is a patented alloy combining sterling silver and platinum.  The alloy is a blend of 92.5% silver and 5% platinum and 2.5% being the undisclosed elements that make up the patent.  Platinaire, unlike most gold and silver, is nickel free and hence hypoallergenic.  It is also fabricated from recycled silver and platinum, making it a green metal that conforms to current demands for sustainability and preserving the earth's resources. The alloy was initially used in the production of very high end flutes for concert level master musicians.  In the last several years, due to rising gold prices it has been in increasing demand for use in the creation of diamond jewelry.

See also
 Platinum sterling
 List of alloys

External links
www.platinaire.com

Precious metal alloys